"What Did I Do to You?" is a song by British singer-songwriter and actress Lisa Stansfield from her debut album, Affection (1989). It was written by Stansfield, Ian Devaney and Andy Morris, and produced by Devaney and Morris. The song was released as the fourth European single on 30 April 1990. It included three previously unreleased songs written by Stansfield, Devaney and Morris: "My Apple Heart," "Lay Me Down" and "Something's Happenin'." "What Did I Do to You?" was remixed by Mark Saunders and by the Grammy Award-winning American house music DJ and producer, David Morales. The single became a top forty hit in the European countries, reaching number fifteen in Italy, number eighteen in Finland, number twenty in Ireland and number twenty-five in the United Kingdom. "What Did I Do to You?" was also released in Japan.

In 2014, the remixes of "What Did I Do to You?" were included on the deluxe 2CD + DVD re-release of Affection and on People Hold On ... The Remix Anthology. They were also featured on The Collection 1989–2003 box set (2014), including previously unreleased Red Zone Mix by David Morales.

Chart performance
Not commercially as successful as the three previous singles from Affection, "What Did I Do to You?" still was a sizeable hit on the charts in Europe. The song entered the top 20 in Finland (18), Ireland (20) and Italy (15), while peaking within the top 30 in the UK. In the latter, the song peaked at number 25 on the UK Singles Chart on 13 May 1990, after having debuted as number 29 the week before. Additionally, it was a top 40 hit in both Belgium (37) and the Netherlands (38), as well as peaking at number 56 on the Eurochart Hot 100 in June same year.

Critical reception
The song received positive reviews from music critics. In an 2019 retrospective review, Matthew Hocter from Albumism declared it as a "upbeat offering". Upon the release, Todd Caudle from Gazette Telegraph wrote that Stansfield's "sensuous voice delivers beautiful love lyrics" in "What Did I Do to You?". David Giles from Music Week said it's "beautifully performed" by the singer. A reviewer from Reading Eagle opined that the song "would be right at home on the Saturday Night Fever soundtrack." Parry Gettelman from The Sentinel felt it "sounds too much like a speeded-up "The Hustle" to be true, but Stansfield makes it credible."

Music video
A music video was produced to promote the single, directed by Philip Richardson, who had previously directed the videos for "All Around the World" and "Live Together". It features Stansfield with her kiss curls, dressed in a white outfit and performing with her band on a stage in front of a jumping audience. The video was later published on Stansfield's official YouTube channel in November 2009, and had generated more than 1,7 million views as of February 2023.

Track listings

 European/UK 7" single
"What Did I Do to You?" (Mark Saunders Remix Edit) – 4:20
"Something's Happenin'" – 3:59

 European/UK/Japanese CD single
"What Did I Do to You?" (Mark Saunders Remix Edit) – 4:20
"My Apple Heart" – 5:19
"Lay Me Down" – 4:17
"Something's Happenin'" – 3:59

 UK 10" single
"What Did I Do to You?" (Mark Saunders Remix) – 5:52
"My Apple Heart" – 5:19
"Lay Me Down" – 4:17
"Something's Happenin'" – 3:59

 European/UK 12" single
"What Did I Do to You?" (Morales Mix) – 7:59
"My Apple Heart" – 4:22
"Lay Me Down" – 3:19
"Something's Happenin'" – 3:15

 UK 12" promotional single
"What Did I Do to You?" (Morales Mix) – 7:59
"What Did I Do to You?" (Anti Poll Tax Dub) – 6:31

 Other remixes
"What Did I Do to You?" (Red Zone Mix) – 7:45

Charts

References

Lisa Stansfield songs
1990 singles
Songs written by Lisa Stansfield
1989 songs
Arista Records singles
Songs written by Ian Devaney
Songs written by Andy Morris (musician)